is a former Japanese football player and manager.

Playing career
Mase was born in Mie Prefecture on October 22, 1973. After graduating from Nippon Sport Science University, he had a brief field career from 1997 to 2000, being in North-Central American teams and living a certain period in Croatia.

Coaching career
After being translator for Ivica Osim and his son Amar Osim during his spell as JEF United Chiba's coach until 2007, Mase became a coach at the club. Form 2010, he became a coach at Fagiano Okayama (2010-2012) and Tokyo Verdy (2013). In January 2015, he became the manager at Blaublitz Akita, as his mother is from Oga, Akita. In 2017, he moved to Ehime FC. However the club results were bad in 2018 season, he was sacked by Ehime FC on May when the club was at the 20th place of 22 clubs. In July 2018, he signed with former club Blaublitz Akita and became a manager for the first time in 2 years.

Managerial statistics
Update; June 30, 2020

References

External links

Profile

1973 births
Living people
Nippon Sport Science University alumni
Association football people from Mie Prefecture
Japanese footballers
deportivo Mictlán players
NK Novalja players
Japanese football managers
J2 League managers
J3 League managers
Blaublitz Akita managers
Ehime FC managers
Expatriate football managers in Mongolia
Mongolia national football team managers
Association football forwards
Japanese expatriate football managers